MTV Switzerland is a localised version of MTV for the German-speaking market in that country. The channel began as an opt-out feed of MTV Central in 2004 featuring localized advertising and sponsorship, but as of April 2009 the channel will feature more local programming. Following the ceasing of VIVA Switzerland, MTV Switzerland was relaunched in April 2009 with more localized features to coincide ina dedicated website MTV.ch was launched in January 2010, alongside new music programming including a Swiss-German version of Brand New (Brand: neu). VIVA Switzerland was later revived in 2012.

The majority of programming on MTV Switzerland is either a simulcast or delayed simulcast of MTV Germany with localized advertising, sponsorship, promos and events highlights relevant to the German-Swiss market.

MTV.ch features the localized album and singles chart.

History
On 1 April 2008 the Swiss version of MTV started.

On 5 October 2010, MTV announced that MTV Germany and MTV Austria will be remain as pay-tv service only. An exception is Switzerland, in which the German-speaking MTV Switzerland continued to be free-to-air.

On 1 July 2011, the new broadcasting logo from the USA was also taken over in Switzerland.

Former Local Shows
Brand: neu
MTV News
Crispy News

Former VJs
Jubaira (previously on VIVA Switzerland)

References

https://web.archive.org/web/20100305022018/http://presse.mtv.de/scripts/pressemappe_mtvschweiz.php3

External links
 

MTV channels
2008 establishments in Switzerland
Music organisations based in Switzerland
Television channels and stations established in 2008
Television stations in Switzerland